A Vision Document is a document that describes a compelling idea, project or other future state for a particular organization, product or service. The Vision defines the product/service to be developed specified in terms of the stakeholder's key needs and desired features. Containing an outline of the envisioned core requirements, it provides the contractual basis for the more detailed technical requirements. It is much shorter and more general than a product requirements document or a marketing requirements document, which outline the specific product plan and marketing plan respectively.

Purpose 
The Vision document provides a high-level executive summary for a project or other undertaking. For software development, for example, a Vision captures the essence of the envisioned solution in the form of high-level requirements and design constraints that provide stakeholders an overview of the system to be developed from a behavioral requirements perspective. 

A Vision document provides input to the project approval process and is, therefore, closely related to the Business case. It communicates the fundamental "why and what" for the project and is a gauge against which all future decisions should be validated.

A Vision document generally contains some or all of the following:

 Revision History
 Signature Page
 Introduction
 Purpose Statement
 Scope Statement
 Problem Statement (What is being solved by the Vision?)
 Business Needs/Requirements
 Product/Solution Overview
 Major Features (Optional)
 Stakeholder Register
 Budgetary Details (Rough Order of Magnitude, ROM)
 Assumptions
 Definitions
 Process Details

Timing 
The Vision is created early in the Inception phase. It should evolve steadily during the earlier portion of the lifecycle, with changes slowing during Construction. It evolves in conjunction with the Business case and is meant to be revised as the understanding of requirements, architecture, plans, and technology evolves.

The Vision serves as input to use case modeling, and is updated and maintained as a separate artifact throughout the project.  For agile projects, the Product Vision can feed into the user story development.

See also 
 Business case
 Business plan
 Innovation
 Planning fallacy
 Reference class forecasting
 User Story
 Win-win

Software requirements